Wang Won may refer to:

Prince Hyoeun ( 10th century), Taejo of Goryeo's son
Duke Gwangpyeong (1083–1170), Munjong of Goryeo's grandson
Chungseon of Goryeo (1275–1325), king of Goryeo
Wang Won subdistrict, Phrom Phiram District, Phitsanulok Province, Thailand